The extended file system, or ext, was implemented in April 1992 as the first file system created specifically for the Linux kernel. It has metadata structure inspired by traditional Unix filesystem principles, and was designed by Rémy Card to overcome certain limitations of the MINIX file system. It was the first implementation that used the virtual file system (VFS), for which support was added in the Linux kernel in version 0.96c, and it could handle file systems up to 2 gigabytes (GB) in size.

ext was the first in the series of extended file systems. In 1993, it was superseded by both ext2 and Xiafs, which competed for a time, but ext2 won because of its long-term viability: ext2 remedied issues with ext, such as the immutability of inodes and fragmentation.

Other extended file systems 
There are other members in the extended file system family:
ext2, the second extended file system.
ext3, the third extended file system.
ext4, the fourth extended file system.

See also 
 List of file systems
 Comparison of file systems

References 

1992 software
Disk file systems
File systems supported by the Linux kernel